The 1918 New Hampshire gubernatorial election was held on November 5, 1918. Republican nominee John H. Bartlett defeated Democratic nominee Nathaniel E. Martin with 54.13% of the vote.

General election

Candidates
John H. Bartlett, Republican
Nathaniel E. Martin, Democratic

Results

References

1918
New Hampshire
Gubernatorial